Bonnyton (Scots: Bonnietoun, Scottish Gaelic: Bonnyton) is a neighbourhood in the burgh of Kilmarnock in East Ayrshire, Scotland, situated in the west of the town. Bonnyton is home to a mix of residential and commercial properties, centred around estates such as Bonnyton Road, Munro Avenue and Gibson Street. The area is home to the Bonnyton Industrial Estate and nearby Kilmarnock railway station.

Previously a village in its own right, Bonnyton was subsumed by Kilmarnock during the towns period of rapid growth and expansion in 1871. In 2020, Bonnyton had a population of 3,741 inhabitants. For the purposes of population gathering, Bonnyton is named as Bonnyton and Town Centre.

The area is also home to Bonnyton Thistle F.C. who became members of the South of Scotland Football League.

History
The area of Bonnyton is believed to date back to 1316 where it is mentioned in a royal charter when Robert the Bruce, King of Scots, granted Sir Robert Boyd extensive lands at the Dean, including land at Bondington (now Bonnyton) and Hertschaw (now Hereshaw), for the support in the First War of Scottish Independence. In 1665 the Scottish Parliament passed an act to encourage cloth production in Scotland and soon afterwards three wool mills were set up at Ayr, Newmilns and Bonnyton. Bonnyton became a part of Kilmarnock in 1871.

The first Morrisons supermarket in Scotland opened in the Bonnyton area of Kilmarnock in West Langlands Street in 2004.

Barclay House
Barclay house is a conversion of the former Caledonia Works, which is a category B listed building of the former Andrew Barclay & Son Railway Engineers; and is now home to 62 apartments in a contemporary style. The development is central to Kilmarnock Town Centre and the Bus and Railway Stations.

Grange Campus 

Bonnyton is now home to three fairly recently built schools, Grange Academy, Annanhill Primary and Park School which have been joined to form Grange Campus. The Grange Campus opened to pupils in 2008. 

Grange Academy plays host to a Scottish Rugby Union 'School of Rugby'. In 2012, the school was selected as the Ayrshire base for the Scottish Football Association's Performance Schools, a system devised to support the development of the best young talented footballers across the country (there are seven such schools across Scotland).

Grange Academy is home to the Scottish Football Association performance school, one of seven schools in Scotland that have been operating since 2012 with the aim to support the development of Scotland's best young footballing talent. The Performance Schools programme is designed to give talented boys and girls, with the best potential to develop their abilities, the opportunity to practise football everyday within an educational environment.

Andrew Barclay Railway Heritage Centre 
First Minister Alex Salmond visited Kilmarnock to officially open the Andrew Barclay Railway Heritage Centre. Opened in January 2008 The Heritage Centre is home to Drake 2086, a locomotive originally built by Andrew Barclay Sons & Co. in 1940.

Politics and government
Bonnyton is represented on East Ayrshire Council as Ward 3 (Kilmarnock West and Crosshouse). The current political structure consists of four local councillors; Lillian Jones (Scottish Labour Party), Tom Cook (Scottish Conservative and Unionist Party), Ian Linton (Scottish National Party) and Douglas Reid (Scottish National Party, also leader of East Ayrshire Council).

In the Scottish Parliament, Bonnyton is represented as part of the Kilmarnock and Irvine Valley constituency. The current MSP for the area is Willie Coffey.

In the UK Parliament, Bonnyton is represented as part of the Kilmarnock and Loudoun constituency. The current MP is Alan Brown.

2022 local election

Bonnyton, as part of the Kilmarnock West and Crosshouse ward, voted in the most recent election to East Ayrshire Council. The results are highlighted in the table below with Councillors elected in bold. 

The SNP (2), Labour (1) and the Conservatives (1) retained the seats they had won at the previous election.

Timeline of Councillors
 
Since the creation of the Kilmarnock West and Crosshouse ward in 2007 in East Ayrshire Council, Bonnyton has been represented by the following councillors.

Economy
 
 

In 2020, the Scottish Government reported that Bonnyton had 475 business sites currently active and operational, contributing business and operational income towards the Economy of Scotland. 

Property development and regeneration company The KLIN Group have their main HQ in Bonnyton, housed at Barclay House on West Langlands Street. 

The area is home to the Bonnyton Industrial Estate situated in Munro Place, just off Munro Avenue. The estate serves as the production base for companies including Brownings the Bakers, All Things Office and The Electrical Network. Popular fish and chip shop, The Bonnyton Cafe, is located on the Bonnyton Road area and has long been a popular eatery for locals.

Like much of the town of Kilmarnock, Bonnyton was home to a number of industrial and factory plants. Carpet yarn firm Blackwood Brothers Ltd. was located between Munro Avenue and Western Road. In October 1999, it was announced that Blackwood Brothers Ltd. was being put up for sale, claiming that it is a "loss making business that is continuing to make loses". At the time, the factory in Bonnyton employed 330 people. The factory closed later in 1999. Fashion brand and retailer Jaeger formerely occupied a large unit in the Bonnyton Industrial Estate which closed in 2002. At the time of the closure, 300 people were employed at the factory.

Economic history of the area focused largely around coal mining and the production of coal, with various coal mining sites located around Bonnyton, including the Bonnyton Colliery and Bonnyton Pit No 6.

Delivery firm Yodel had, until 2021, had its main delivery depot in Bonnyton, just off Munro Avenue. The company left the site in 2021 and moved to nearby Munro Place.

Transport

Given its centralised location in Kilmarnock, Bonnyton has ample transportation services including regular bus services from Kilmarnock bus station to locations such as University Hospital Crosshouse, Irvine and Ardrossan. The Kilmarnock railway station is located within Bonnyton, with train services from Kilmarnock to Glasgow Central railway station. Taxi company, Thistle Cabs, is located in Bonnyton, with its control centre on Bonnyton Road.

Sports 
Bonnyton Thistle F.C. became members of the South of Scotland Football League in 2017. Founded in 1912, they were previously a youth and amateur team.

Despite their name referencing Bonnyton, their new home ground is The Synergy Arena, located in the Townholm area of Kilmarnock, which has a capacity of 1,000. It was opened in 2017 to coincide with the club's move into senior football.

The clubs previous home ground, located in the Warwickhill Road area of Bonnyton, was vacated by the club in 2017 following their move to Townholm. Their new lease of the Synergy Area in Townholm is for a period of 25 years, lasting until 16 February 2042. During this period, East Ayrshire Council advertised the stadium at Warwickhill Road up for lease.

References

Villages in East Ayrshire
Kilmarnock